Dalbergia greveana is a species of legume in the family Fabaceae.

It is found only in Madagascar and is threatened by habitat loss.

References

greveana
Endemic flora of Madagascar
Near threatened plants
Taxa named by Henri Ernest Baillon
Taxonomy articles created by Polbot